The European Union Civil Service Tribunal was a specialised court within the Court of Justice of the European Union. It was established on 2 December 2005. It ceased to exist on 1 September 2016.

Legal basis
The Treaty of Nice provides for the creation of judicial panels in certain specific areas. This provision is later amended and codified in Article 257 ("specialised courts") of the Treaty on the Functioning of the European Union by the Treaty of Lisbon:

The Council of the European Union on 2 November 2004, adopted on that basis a decision establishing the European Union Civil Service Tribunal. The new specialised court, composed of seven judges, was called upon to adjudicate in disputes between the European Union and its civil service, a jurisdiction until 2005 was exercised by the General Court. Its decisions was subject to appeal on questions of law only to the General Court and, in exceptional cases, to review by the European Court of Justice. It was established on 2 December 2005. It was dissolved on 1 September 2016, despite the success in its mandate, in favour of doubling the size of the General Court.

Presidents of the Civil Service Tribunal

Judges on the Civil Service Tribunal in 2016

Source:

References

Further reading

External links
European Union Civil Service Tribunal: official website

2005 establishments in the European Union
2016 disestablishments in the European Union
 
Courts and tribunals established in 2005
Civil Service Tribunal, European Union
Civil Service Tribunal, European Union
Tribunals